Redlands is an electoral district of the Legislative Assembly in the Australian state of Queensland. It primarily covers coastal suburbs on the southside of the city of Brisbane, from Thornlands south to the Logan River.

Members for Redlands

Election results

References

External links
 

Redlands